The Société des ingénieurs de l'automobile is an association of French engineers, managers, technicians and automotive professionals working in the automotive sector in France.

This association is regulated under the loi de 1901.

Its main goal is to promote innovation and technical exchange between automotive professionals.
 
Traditionally, the association president is alternatively proposed by the administration council of each main French car manufacturer, Renault and Peugeot.

The Société des ingénieurs de l'automobile is a member of the FISITA, as is the Society of Automotive Engineers.

References

External links 
 
 

Engineering societies based in France
Motor trade associations